Dennis K. Burke (born 1962) is a former United States Attorney for the District of Arizona.

Early life and education
Burke was born in Chicago, Illinois in 1962. Burke received a bachelor's degree from Georgetown University in 1985 and earned his Juris Doctor from University of Arizona College of Law in 1988. After completing law school, Burke served as a law clerk for Judge James Moeller of the Arizona Supreme Court.

Career
Republican Diane Humetewa stepped down on August 2, 2009. On Wednesday, September 16, 2009, Dennis K. Burke was sworn in as the United States Attorney for the District of Arizona. He was recently appointed to serve on the Attorney General's Advisory Committee (AGAC) which advises the Attorney General on policy, management, and operational issues at the Department of Justice. He was also selected to be the Chair of the AGAC Subcommittee on Border and Immigration Law Enforcement and a member of two other AGAC Subcommittees on Native American Issues and Civil Rights.

Burke has over 20 years of public service at both the Federal and State levels. Burke was most recently a Senior Advisor to Department of Homeland Security Secretary Janet Napolitano. He served as Chief of Staff to Arizona Governor Janet Napolitano from 2003 to 2008. Prior to that position, he worked in the Arizona Attorney General's Office as the Chief Deputy Attorney General. He is a former Assistant United States Attorney for the District of Arizona prosecuting drug trafficking cases, was the Assistant Attorney General for Legislative Affairs at the United States Department of Justice, a Senior Policy Analyst for the White House Domestic Policy Council during the Clinton Administration and a Majority Counsel for the United States Senate Judiciary Committee, where he worked on three Supreme Court nominations, intellectual property as well as crime and law enforcement legislation. Senator Dennis DeConcini (D-AZ) credited Burke and Rahm Emanuel with fostering and getting the 1994 Assault Weapon Ban passed.

He graduated from Georgetown University in 1985 and received a law degree in 1988 from University of Arizona, College of Law in Tucson, where he served as Executive Editor of the Arizona Law Review. After law school, Burke was a clerk for the Honorable James Moeller on the Arizona Supreme Court. He was also an adjunct professor of law at the Sandra Day O'Connor College of Law at Arizona State University. Burke has received numerous awards and commendations for his years in public service, including the Public Advocate Award from Chicanos Por La Causa in Phoenix, Arizona and the Minuteman Award from the Arizona National Guard.

On July 10, 2009, Burke was nominated by President Barack Obama to serve as the United States Attorney for the District of Arizona. He was confirmed by unanimous consent by the U.S. Senate on September 15, 2009.

In 2013, Burke partnered with Noah Kroloff, Mark Sullivan, David Aguilar, John Kaites and Jerry Reinsdorf to found Global Security and Innovative Strategies.

Involvement in Fast and Furious
On August 30, 2011, Burke resigned, (See Burke Resignation Letter to President Barack Obama below.), as a result of increased pressure being applied to his U.S. Attorney for the District of Arizona office from various directions, including Congress, in the wake of the gunwalker scandal. Project Gunrunner occurred within the ranks of the U.S. Justice Department, specifically the FBI and the BATF&E, and resulted in sweeping investigations and multiple resignations with Burke's resignation being the most senior of these.

Former U.S. Attorney Dennis Burke admitted leaking a sensitive document about a federal agent (Agent John Dodson) who blew the whistle on the gunrunning operation. Mr. Burke’s Phoenix attorney, Lee Stein, said in a Nov. 8 2011 letter to the Justice Department’s Office of Inspector General that his client had provided information to a reporter who was working on several stories involving Fast and Furious.

The family of slain U.S. Border Patrol Agent Brian Terry charged that Mr. Burke, then US Attorney for the District of Arizona, lied to them about the guns found at the crime scene in an attempt to hide the weapons' connection to the ATF's failed Fast and Furious gun sales operation.
Terry was killed in December 2010, allegedly by Mexican bandits carrying at least two AK-47 semiautomatic rifles that had been purchased in Arizona as part of Fast and Furious. The operation was intended to catch drug lords using illegal weapons, but the ATF immediately lost track of 1,700 firearms.
The Terry family alleged that then-U.S. Atty. Dennis K. Burke told them last March that the two weapons came from a store in Texas and were not part of Fast and Furious.
The family made their allegations in a "notice of claim" stating that they intend to sue the Bureau of Alcohol, Tobacco, Firearms and Explosives and the Justice Department for $25 million. They called the gun-tracking operation "abominable, reckless, nonsensical."

In May 2013, Burke was criticized by the Department of Justice Inspector General for an inappropriate leak to Fox news.

On March 27, 2014, the Arizona Bar Association reprimanded Dennis Burke.

References

 Burke's August 2011 Resignation Letter To President Barack Obama - CBS News
(8) http://www.azcentral.com/story/opinion/editorial/2014/03/28/fast-furious-dennis-burke-reprimand/7001443/

1962 births
Living people
Georgetown University alumni
James E. Rogers College of Law alumni
United States Attorneys for the District of Arizona
Lawyers from Chicago